Robiquet is a French surname. Notable people with the surname include:

Jean Robiquet, French art historian, art critic, and curator
Marie Lucas Robiquet (1858–1959), French Orientalist artist
Pierre Jean Robiquet (1780–1840), French chemist

French-language surnames